Ilse Plume is an illustrator of children's books.  Her first book, The Bremen Town Musicians, was a Caldecott Honor book for 1981. She is also a teacher of Children's Book Illustration at the School of the Museum of Fine Arts, Boston and Massachusetts College of Art and Design in Boston, Massachusetts.

References

External links
 
 
Interview with Ilse Plume, All About Kids! TV Series #71 (1990)

Living people
American children's book illustrators
Massachusetts College of Art and Design faculty
Year of birth missing (living people)
Place of birth missing (living people)